The Medal "For the Capture of Berlin" was a World War II campaign medal of the Soviet Union established on June 9, 1945 by decree of the Presidium of the Supreme Soviet of the USSR to satisfy the petition of the People's Commissariat for Defense of the Soviet Union.  The medal's statute was amended on July 18, 1980 by decree of the Presidium of the Supreme Soviet of the USSR № 2523-X.

Medal statute 
The Medal "For the Capture of Berlin" was awarded to soldiers of the Red Army, Navy, and troops of the NKVD, direct participants of the assault and capture of Berlin as well as to the organizers and leaders of combat operations in the capture of this city.

Award of the medal was made on behalf of the Presidium of the Supreme Soviet of the USSR on the basis of documents attesting to actual participation in the capture of Berlin. Serving military personnel received the medal from their unit commander, retirees from military service received the medal from a regional, municipal or district military commissioner in the recipient's community.

The Medal "For the Capture of Berlin" was worn on the left side of the chest and in the presence of other awards of the USSR, was located immediately after the Medal "For the Capture of Vienna".  If worn in the presence of orders or medals of the Russian Federation, the latter have precedence.

Medal description 
The Medal "For the Capture of Berlin" was a 32mm in diameter circular brass medal with a raised rim on the obverse.  On its pebbled obverse at the top, a plain five-pointed star, its top point touching the medal upper rim. Below the star, the relief inscription in bold letters on three rows "FOR THE CAPTURE OF BERLIN" ending halfway down the medal. At the bottom, the relief image of a wreath of oak branches going up the left and right circumference of the medal up to the lower row of the inscription.  On the reverse near the top, the relief date on three rows over a relief plain five-pointed star "2 MAY 1945".

The Medal "For the Capture of Berlin" was secured by a ring through the medal suspension loop to a standard Soviet pentagonal mount covered by a 24mm wide red silk moiré ribbon with a 12mm wide Ribbon of St. George in the center.

Notable recipients

Soviet people
Marshal of the Soviet Union Georgy Konstantinovich Zhukov
Marshal of Armoured Troops Mikhail Efimovich Katukov
Reichstag attacker Lieutenant Alexei Berest
Reichstag flag raiser Sergeant Meliton Varlamovich Kantaria
Reichstag flag raiser Sergeant Mikhail Alekseevich Yegorov
Marshal of Aviation Alexander Ivanovich Pokryshkin
Marshal of the Soviet Union Vasily Ivanovich Chuikov
Marshal of the Soviet Union Ivan Ignatyevich Yakubovsky
Marshal of the Soviet Union Ivan Stepanovich Konev
Marshal of the Soviet Union Konstantin Rokossovskiy
Captain Iosif Zeusovich "Ios" Teper
Army General Ivan Yefimovich Petrov
Marshal of the Soviet Union Pavel Fyodorovich Batitsky
Lieutenant General Semyon Moiseevich Krivoshein
Colonel General Yakov Timofeyevich Cherevichenko
Army General Ivan Ivanovich Fedyuninsky
Sailor Lev Efimovich Kerbel
Fighter ace Lieutenant Colonel Vasily Maximovich Afonin
Marshal of Artillery Vasily Ivanovich Kazakov
Army General Mikhail Sergeevich Malinin
Marshal of Aviation Serhi Gnatovich Rudenko
Lieutenant General Nikolai Pavlovich Simoniak
Captain Gabriel Ilyich Urazovsky
Army General Sagadat Kozhahmetovich Nurmagambetov
Sergeant Shabsa Mashkautsan, Hero of the Soviet Union

Foreign nationals
General, later President Wojciech Witold Jaruzelski (Poland)
Marshal of Poland Marian "Marek" Spychalski (Poland)
Army General Stanislav Gilyarovich Poplavsky (Poland)
Brigadier General Mieczysław Cygan (Poland)

See also 

Battle of Berlin
Ribbon of St. George
Medal for Participation in the Battle of Berlin
Orders, decorations, and medals of the Soviet Union

References

External links 
 Legal Library of the USSR

1945 establishments in the Soviet Union
Awards established in 1945
Battle of Berlin
Germany–Soviet Union relations
Soviet campaign medals